Baitang may refer to the following locations in China:

 Baitang, Fujian (白塘镇), town in Hanjiang District, Putian, Fujian
 Baitang, Miluo (白塘镇), a town in Miluo City, Hunan province
 Baitang, Guangdong (柏塘镇), town in Boluo County, Guangdong